A list of adventure films released in the 1950s.

1950

1951

1952

1953

1954

1955

1956

1957

1958

1959

References

1950s adventure films
1950s
Adventure